Major-General Edward Osborne Hewett  (25 September 1835 – 3 June 1897) was a British Army officer and member of the Royal Engineers who was the first Commandant of the Royal Military College of Canada. He chose the Royal Military College's motto, "Truth, Duty, Valour".

Hewett was born in Hampshire to John Hewett, deputy lieutenant of Glamorgan and Frances Thornewell, daughter of Thomas Thornewell,  deputy lieutenant of Staffordshire. He was educated at Cheltenham College and the Royal Military Academy, Woolwich.

He was appointed a Companion of the Order of St Michael and St George (CMG) in the 1883 Birthday Honours.

Personal life
Hewett married Catherine Mary Biscoe  in Toronto in 1864. They had four sons and eight daughters. Sir Arthur Edward Grasett  was his grandson.

Catherine Frances Hewett (1866–1941), married Arthur Wanton Grasell, mother of Sir Arthur Grasett 
Lt Col. Edward Vincent Osborne Hewett  (1867–1953)
Mary Louisa Hewett (1868–1911)
Eleanor Clare Hewett (1870–1950)
Edith Cecilia Hewett (1871–1925)
Capt. Henry Meyrick Hewett (1874 – 30 April 1916), killed in Dublin during the Easter Rising 
Margaret Agnata Hewett (1876–1971)
Gwendolen Elizabeth Hewett (1877–1964), married William Garnett Braithwaite
Rhoda Sophia Hewett (1878–1962), married Rear-Admiral Arthur David Ricardo
Constance Thornewill Hewett (1880–1956)
Cmdr George Osborne Hewett (1884–1964)

At age 61, Hewett died at Royal Military Academy Woolwich after breaking his leg playing tennis.

References  

1835 births
1897 deaths
Companions of the Order of St Michael and St George
Royal Engineers officers
People from Southsea
People educated at Cheltenham College
Graduates of the Royal Military Academy, Woolwich
Commandants of the Royal Military College of Canada